The Oregon Wing is one of six wings that comprise the Pacific Region and one of 52 wings in the Civil Air Patrol.  It serves as the headquarters for Civil Air Patrol units in the state of Oregon. Oregon Wing headquarters is located in Eugene, Oregon. The wing itself oversees nearly 500 cadet and adult members serving with 13 squadrons or flights across the state of Oregon.

Mission
The Oregon Wing performs the three missions of the Civil Air Patrol: Emergency Services; a cadet program to build future leaders from American youth; and providing Aerospace Education for both CAP members and the general public.

Emergency services
The Civil Air Patrol provides emergency services mission support to local, state and federal agencies. These mission support activities include performing support for search and rescue activities, homeland security and disaster relief, assisting in humanitarian aid assignments during times of crisis, and aerial photography. CAP provides support to the Air Force by conducting light transport, communications support, low-altitude route surveys, and by conducting other support missions.

Cadet programs
The Civil Air Patrol offers a cadet program for youth aged 12 to 21, which includes providing cadets with aerospace education, leadership training, physical fitness and character development training.  Cadets achieve ranks and milestones through a structured training program.  They wear the Air Force style uniform, learn military style drill and ceremonies, provide color and honor guard support, and learn how to become effective leaders.  Additionally, the national CAP cadet program provides unique training opportunities across the country.

Aerospace education
The Civil Air Patrol teaches aerospace education to CAP members and the general public. The aerospace education mission is accomplished through providing training to the members of CAP through the cadet program, and offering workshops for youth throughout the nation through schools and public aviation events.  The organization also provides STEM kits to units, aerospace educators and school teachers at no cost to advance this initiative.

Organization

See also
Awards and decorations of the Civil Air Patrol
Oregon Civil Defense Force

References

External links
Oregon Wing Civil Air Patrol official website

Wings of the Civil Air Patrol
Education in Oregon
Military in Oregon